Deh-e Kharan (also Romanized as Deh-e Kharān; also known as Deh-e Kharānī) is a village in Poshtdarband Rural District, in the Central District of Kermanshah County, Kermanshah Province, Iran. At the 2006 census, the population was 337, in 75 families.

References 

Populated places in Kermanshah County